Čelinac is a town and municipality located in  Republika Srpska, Bosnia and Herzegovina. As of 2013, it has a population of 15,548 inhabitants, while the town of Čelinac has a population of 5,097 inhabitants.

Geography
It is located by Jošavka and Vrbanja rivers, between municipalities of Laktaši and Prnjavor to the north, Teslić to the east, Kotor Varoš, Kneževo (formerly known as Skender Vakuf) to the south, and Banja Luka to the west.

History

War in Yugoslavia
The main initiator and leader of persecution of the non-Serbian population in the valley of the Vrbanja river  and Bosanska Krajina, including Čelinac, was a member of the radical currents SDS - Radoslav Brdjanin, a native of the nearby village of Popovac.

Brđanin was a leading political figure in Autonomous Region of Krajina (ARK). During The war in Bosnia and Herzegovina in the 1990s, was the key positions at the municipal, regional and "republic" level. Among other things, he was the first vice president of the Assembly of the ARK, president of the ARK Crisis Staff and later as Acting Vice Minister for Production, Minister for Construction, Traffic and Utilities and acting Deputy Prime Minister Republika Srpska (RS).
International Criminal Tribunal for the former Yugoslavia (ICTY) condemned him for various crimes to 30 years in prison.

During the War in Bosnia, along with other generally known reprisals, local authorities have introduced the original limits of Bosniaks and Croats, i.e. non-Serb population. In addition to those who have experienced this, among other things, bears witness to the indictment against Radovan Karadžić to tribunal in The Hague. At the hearing, Nikola Poplašen, 2013, one of the questions to the witness for the defense, was:

Settlements
Aside from the town of Čelinac, the municipality includes the following settlements:

 Balte
 Basići
 Branešci Donji
 Branešci Gornji
 Brezičani
 Crni Vrh
 Čelinac Gornji
 Dubrava Nova
 Dubrava Stara
 Grabovac
 Jošavka Donja
 Jošavka Gornja
 Kablovi
 Kamenica
 Lađevci
 Lipovac
 Markovac
 Mehovci
 Memići
 Miloševo
 Opsječko
 Popovac
 Skatavica
 Šahinovići
 Šnjegotina Donja
 Šnjegotina Srednja
 Šnjegotina Velika
 Štrbe
 Vijačani Gornji

Demographics

Population

Ethnic composition

Economy
The following table gives a preview of total number of registered employed people per their core activity (as of 2016):

See also
Municipalities of Republika Srpska

Notable people
 Radoslav Brđanin, politician
 Rajko Kuzmanović, politician
 Željko Blagojević, ultramarathon

References

External links

 Official Municipality Web Page
 Čelinac on the Internet

 
Cities and towns in Republika Srpska
Populated places in Čelinac